Fly Castelluccio Paramotor Paragliding and Trike srl was an Italian aircraft manufacturer based in Ascoli Piceno. The company specialized in the design and manufacture of paragliders, paramotors, ultralight trikes and powered parachutes in the form of ready-to-fly aircraft for the US FAR 103 Ultralight Vehicles rules, and the European Fédération Aéronautique Internationale microlight category.

The company seems to have been founded about 2000 and gone out of business in 2007.

The company was an Italian Società a responsabilità limitata (Srl), a limited liability company.

In 2004 Fly Castelluccio was noted as being the largest manufacturer of its type in Italy and that it was poised to become the largest in Europe. Reviewer Rene Coulon in 2003 described the company as "the most refreshing manufacturer in this field" and noted their wide presence at all major shows globally.

The company produced an extensive range of aircraft, that by 2007 included ten paramotor models, one ultralight trike, three powered parachutes, three lines of paragliders and an emergency parachute model.

Aircraft

References

External links
Company website archives on Archive.org

Defunct aircraft manufacturers of Italy
Ultralight aircraft
Homebuilt aircraft
Ultralight trikes
Powered parachutes